In Ireland, the state retains laws that allow for censorship, including specific laws covering films, advertisements, newspapers and magazines, as well as terrorism and pornography. In the early years of the state, censorship was widely enforced, particularly in areas that were perceived to be in contradiction of Roman Catholic dogma, including abortion, sexuality and homosexuality. The church had banned many books and theories for centuries, listed in the Index Librorum Prohibitorum.

Current censorship

Film censorship

Ireland's Film Censors Office, renamed in 2008 as the Irish Film Classification Office, heavily cut films and videos for rental release, or placed high age ratings on them. In 2000 The Cider House Rules received an 18 certificate in Ireland due to its themes of abortion and incest, although in other countries, such as the UK, the film received a 12 certificate.

Advertisements

Advertisements are regulated by the Advertising Standards Authority for Ireland, and must be truthful and factually accurate. In addition, adverts for illegal services are not allowed. The ASAI is a voluntary industry body which has no statutory powers and has no power to remove a publication from circulation. This power is vested in the Censorship of Publications Board. Given the status of the ASAI some advertisers choose to continually ignore its rulings by running controversial advertisements purely to draw attention to their products and services.

Newspapers and magazines

Whilst still theoretically censorable, newspapers and magazines are free to publish anything which does not break Ireland's tough libel laws. The Censorship of Publications Board reviews newspapers and magazines referred to it by the Customs and Excise and by members of the public. Until the late 1980s a large number of (mainly foreign) newspaper and magazines were banned in Ireland including Playboy and the News of the World, the British edition of which was still, theoretically, banned when it ceased publication.

The listing of periodicals under permanent banning orders as of 2007 includes many publications which have ceased to be published, as well as ones which are now sold freely without any realistic chance of prosecution, such as Health and Efficiency and The Weekly News. A large proportion of the banning orders date from the 1950s or before; and a similar proportion cover true crime publications, a type which were once illegal due to a perceived risk of glorifying or encouraging criminal behaviour.

In 2011, Paul Raymond Publications successfully appealed against the ban on 5 of their publications, one of which has been banned for nearly 80 years, and these publications can now be freely sold.

Pornography

Pornography that includes any participants being beneath the Irish age of consent is strictly illegal. This includes videos, DVD, film, photographs, digital files, drawings and text descriptions. There are no other laws banning specific types of pornography in Ireland.

However, distribution of obscene material by phone can be prosecuted under the Post Office (Amendment) Act of 1951, the Director of Film Classification at the Irish Film Classification Office may ban public display of films considered to be obscene, and the Censorship of Publications Board may prohibit the sale and distribution of books and periodicals if they are found to be obscene. The magazine Playboy was illegal in Ireland until 1995.

In the 1960s, Roman Catholic Archbishop of Dublin John Charles McQuaid lobbied the Irish government to have pornography banned outright.

The government-controlled IE Domain Registry currently has a ban on all domain names it considers "offensive or contrary to public policy or generally accepted principles of morality". In particular, the domains Pornography.ie and Porn.ie are known to be banned.

Central Bank of Ireland

In July 2009, the Central Bank of Ireland blocked insurers and banks from making any critical statements containing "any references" to them by means either of "public press statements" or un-approved public references, whether "written or oral."

The Credit Institutions (Stabilisation) Act 2010

This Act was passed by 78–71 in December 2010 in partial response to the post-2008 Irish banking crisis. Section 60 provides that the Irish government may apply to the courts for an order made under the Act to be heard in private. Section 59 prohibits anyone from publishing the fact that the minister has made an order or direction under the Act; even publication that such a prohibition order has been made is also an offence under the Act. Days after the Act was passed, an order was sought by minister Brian Lenihan Jnr and approved allowing a transfer of over €3,700,000,000 into Allied Irish Bank, then an insolvent bank. Two Irish Times reporters were expelled from the court by judge Maureen Harding Clark just before the hearing.

Censorship of books

On 18 November 1942 Senator Sir John Keane moved in Seanad Éireann: "That, in the opinion of Seanad Éireann, the Censorship of Publications Board appointed by the Minister for Justice under the Censorship of Publications Act 1929, has ceased to retain public confidence, and that steps should be taken by the Minister to reconstitute the board". After four days of debate, the motion was roundly defeated: Tá (for) 2 votes – Sir John Keane and Joseph Johnston – Níl (against) 34 votes.

Formerly censored topics

The Troubles: RTÉ and Section 31 of the Broadcasting Authority Act

During the Troubles in Northern Ireland, from 1968 to 1994, censorship was used principally to prevent Raidió Teilifís Éireann (RTÉ) interviews with spokespersons for Sinn Féin and for the IRA. Under Section 31 of the Broadcasting Authority Act (1960), the Minister for Posts & Telegraphs could issue a Ministerial Order to the government-appointed RTÉ Authority not to broadcast material specified in the written order. In 1971 the first ever Order under the section was issued by Fianna Fáil Minister for Posts and Telegraphs Gerry Collins. It instructed RTÉ not to broadcast,
any matter that could be calculated to promote the aims or activities of any organisation which engages in, promotes, encourages or advocates the attaining of any particular objectives by violent means.
Collins refused clarification when RTÉ asked for advice on what this legal instruction meant in practice. RTÉ interpreted the Order politically to mean that spokespersons for the Provisional and Official IRA could no longer appear on air. In 1972 the government sacked the RTÉ Authority for not sufficiently disciplining broadcasters the government accused of breaching the Order. RTÉ's Kevin O'Kelly had reported on an interview that he conducted with the (Provisional) IRA Chief of Staff, Sean MacStiofáin, on the Radio Éireann This Week programme. The recorded interview was not itself broadcast. MacStiofáin's voice was not heard. However, he was arrested after the O'Kelly interview and charged with membership of the IRA, an illegal organisation. Soon afterwards, at the non-jury Special Criminal Court O'Kelly was jailed briefly for contempt because he refused to identify a voice on a tape seized by the Gardaí as that of Mac Stiofáin. Mac Stiofáin was convicted in any case. On appeal by O'Kelly to the Supreme Court a fine was substituted as a means purging O'Kelly's contempt. The fine was paid anonymously and O'Kelly was released.

In 1976, Labour Minister for Posts and Telegraphs Conor Cruise O'Brien amended Section 31 of the Broadcasting Act. He also issued a new Section 31 Order. O'Brien censored spokespersons for specific organisations, including the Sinn Féin political party, rather than specified content. That prevented RTÉ from interviewing Sinn Féin spokespersons under any circumstances, even if the subject was unrelated to the IRA campaign in Northern Ireland conflict. On one occasion that led to the interruption of a call-in show about gardening on radio because a caller was a member of Sinn Féin. The changes eroded liberal interpretations by RTÉ of its censorship responsibilities, afforded by the original 1971 Order, and encouraged a process of illiberal interpretation.

Also in 1976, O'Brien attempted to extend censorship to newspaper coverage of the 'Troubles' by targeting in particular The Irish Press; In an interview with Washington Post reporter Bernard Nossiter, O'Brien identified Press Editor, Tim Pat Coogan, as someone who might be prosecuted under a proposed amendment to the Offences Against the State Act. O'Brien cited pro-republican Letters to the Editor as coming under the terms of the legislation for which the editor could be made legally liable. Coogan, who was immediately warned of O'Brien's intentions by Nossiter, then published the Nossiter-O'Brien interview (as did The Irish Times). Due to public opposition the proposed provisions were amended to remove the perceived threat to newspapers. The 1973-77 Fine Gael/Labour Coalition Government also tried to prosecute the Irish Press for its coverage of the maltreatment of republican prisoners by the Garda Heavy Gang, with the paper winning the case.

The United Kingdom operated similar rules between 1988 and 1994 covering eleven republican and loyalist organisations, but they were less severe than the Section 31 Order. For instance, British broadcasters could dub Sinn Féin speeches and interviews with an actor's voice, or subtitle footage. That was not possible in Ireland where O'Brien's Section 31 Order, which remained in place until 1994, specifically banned 'reports of interviews' with spokespersons for censored organisations. Moreover, British broadcasters were more liberal than RTÉ in defining when a person was a spokesperson for a censored organisation. They held that an MP like Sinn Féin President Gerry Adams or a Sinn Féin councillor could be interviewed about constituency business or in their private capacity. RTÉ would not allow this under any circumstances, a stance that caused a crisis in RTÉ in the early 1990s. In addition, the British censorship rules did not apply at election time, whereas they operated at all times in Ireland.

Under severe pressure from successive governments, from approximately 1977 RTÉ extended Section 31 to censor all Sinn Féin members, not merely the Sinn Féin spokespersons specified in the Section 31 Order. This extension of the Order came to a head in the early 1990s. Sinn Féin member Larry O'Toole was not permitted to talk on RTÉ about a strike in Gateaux, a cake factory in Finglas, north Dublin, where O'Toole worked. He was informed in writing by RTÉ that his Sinn Féin membership was the reason for the censorship. O'Toole challenged what he contended was RTÉ self-censorship in the High Court. After the court found in O'Toole's favour in August 1992, RTÉ appealed the ruling that liberalised its Section 31 regime. Consequently, RTÉ were accused of appealing to be censored. RTÉ then lost in the Supreme Court in March 1993.

In 1991, European Commission of Human Rights upheld the ban in case Purcell v. Ireland, though not unanimously. The Section 31 broadcasting ban lapsed on 19 January 1994 because it was not renewed by Minister for Arts, Culture and the Gaeltacht Michael D. Higgins, eight months prior to the August 1994 IRA ceasefire. The last person censored under the lapsing Order in January 1994 was Larry O'Toole, who was banned from appearing in a joint RTÉ/Channel Four programme on the Northern Ireland conflict, chaired by Channel Four's John Snow. The Channel Four production team wished to speak to O'Toole about his court victory. RTÉ would not permit this as O'Toole had been chosen as a candidate in European elections to be held five months later. RTÉ said O'Toole was therefore a Sinn Féin spokesperson, irrespective of the capacity in which he was to be interviewed or the proposed interview's distant relationship with a future election.

Abortion and birth control

Until the early 1990s, discussing abortion in any way, including the provision of impartial information, was disallowed, and any publication providing information on the medical treatment would be confiscated. In the 1980s, the Irish Family Planning Association and the Trinity College Dublin and University College Dublin students' unions were successfully sued by the Society for the Protection of Unborn Children for publishing telephone numbers for abortion clinics in the United Kingdom. On one occasion British newspaper The Guardian was withdrawn by its Irish distributors for a day to preempt a threatened ban due to the inclusion of an advertisement for a UK abortion clinic in that day's issue (despite the advert having appeared on a number of prior occasions without incident).

In May 1992, the Democratic Left T.D. Proinsias De Rossa subverted this ban by reading the offending telephone numbers into the Dáil record; because of his absolute privilege as a member of the Oireachtas, he avoided a lawsuit.

In the wake of the X Case, the fourteenth amendment of the Constitution of Ireland approved in November 1992 removed the constitutional prohibition. Regulation of access to information to abortion was put on a statutory basis by the Regulation of Information (Services Outside the State For Termination of Pregnancies) Act 1995. This was repealed by the Health (Regulation of Termination of Pregnancy) Act 2018.

Blasphemy

Until 2018, blasphemy was prohibited by Article 40.6.1º.i. of the 1937 Constitution. The common law offence of blasphemous libel, applicable only to Christianity and last prosecuted in 1855, was ruled in 1999 to be incompatible with the Constitution's guarantee of religious equality. Since banning blasphemy was mandated by the Constitution, abolishing the offence required a referendum. Since it was deemed by the government of the time that a referendum solely for that purpose "would rightly be seen as a time wasting and expensive exercise", the lacuna was filled in 2009 by a new offence of "publication or utterance of blasphemous matter", against any religion, under the Defamation Act 2009, section 36. The law included the offence of blasphemous libel. It was never enforced.

The advocacy group Atheist Ireland responded to the enactment by announcing the formation of the "Church of Dermotology" (named after Dermot Ahern, the minister who introduced the 2009 law).[51] On the date on which the law came into effect, it published a series of potentially blasphemous quotations on its website and vowed to challenge any resulting legal action.[52] Scientist Richard Dawkins described the new law as "wretched, backward and uncivilised".

After the 2015 Charlie Hebdo shooting, Ali Selim of the Islamic Cultural Centre of Ireland suggested that the blasphemy provision of the Defamation Act 2009 should be applied to any media outlet reproducing cartoons depicting Muhammad as part of the "Je suis Charlie" campaign.[53]

The text of the 2009 Act defined the crime where: he or she publishes or utters matter that is grossly abusive or insulting in relation to matters held sacred by any religion, thereby causing outrage among a substantial number of the adherents of that religion, and (b) he or she intends, by the publication or utterance of the matter concerned, to cause such outrage.
 The judge would need to be satisfied the matter is "abusive and insulting" as distinct from opinion.
 Judicial interpretation of "held sacred" and "any religion" could render the Act unenforceable.
 A defendant's lawyer would argue the definition of "grossly", "thereby causing", "outrage" and "substantial number".
 Article s.36 (3) provides that – "it shall be a defence to proceedings for an offence under this section for the defendant to prove that a reasonable person would find genuine literary, artistic, political, scientific, or academic value in the matter to which the offence relates.
 Further, a "religion" is further defined in s.36 (4); it – does not include an organisation or cult— (a) the principal object of which is the making of profit, or (b) that employs oppressive psychological manipulation— (i) of its followers, or (ii) for the purpose of gaining new followers.
 s.36 could be held to be in breach of 44.2.1º of the Constitution The State shall not impose any disabilities or make any discrimination on the ground of religious profession, belief or status."
In October 2014, Minister of State Aodhán Ó Ríordáin gave the official government response to a report on the blasphemy issue by the Constitutional Convention, announcing that it had decided to hold a referendum on the issue.[71]

On 26 October 2018, a constitutional amendment was approved by a margin of 64.85% to 35.15% which removed the offence of blasphemy from the Constitution. The provisions of the Defamation Act 2009 were repealed upon the commencement of the Blasphemy (Abolition of Offences and Related Matters) Act 2019 on 17 January 2020.

Mail

Censorship of mail in Ireland goes back to, at least, the 1660s and possibly earlier. Both overt and covert censorship of Irish mail took place, mainly in England and sometimes using warrants, from then through the 19th century. The Irish Civil War saw mail raided by the IRA, marked as censored and sometimes opened. This was the first recorded such action within the new state. The National Army also opened mail and censorship of irregulars' mail in prisons took place.

During the 1939–1945 Emergency extensive postal censorship took place under the control of the Department of Defence whose powers were conferred by the Emergency Powers Act 1939. Civilian mail was controlled by the approximately 200 censors who worked in Dublin's Exchequer Street and who had all been vetted by the G2 Directorate of Intelligence and the Gardaí. Using the Black List and White List to target certain mail, the small staff were unable to effect 100% censorship; however, continental European mail was all reviewed, as was all incoming and outbound airmail. Following the overthrow of France and the Low Countries in May 1940, the British instigated full terminal mail censorship but the Irish were unable to look at more than about 10% due to the enormous staff this would have required. Covert censorship of mail between Northern Ireland and the south was effected by warrants obtained by G2, who also obtained warrants from the Minister for Justice for internal mail oversight.

The military internees, British, German and a few of other nationalities, held in the Curragh Camp had their mail censored, even local mail, though they are known to have posted their letters outside the camp to try to evade the camp oversight. IRA internees' mail was also censored under the Offences against the State Act that had been in place since June 1939.

The Border Campaign led to the internment of IRA members, again under the Offences against the State Act, and their mail was overtly censored between 1957 and 1960 most often with an Irish language censor mark reading Ceadaithe ag an gCinsire Mileata applied to the outside of the letter and also to the sheets contained within. In the 1980s mail from IRA members imprisoned in Limerick and likely also Portlaoise prisons has been recorded as censored but there is no record of civilian mail censorship since 1945.

Unusual omissions

Music

Music videos are exempt from film classification, whereas in the UK, they must be classified.  Broadcasters usually use their discretion and obey the UK classifications and showing-time restrictions. Ireland receives all of the UK music channels, which are subject to UK music video laws; with the only Irish regulated broadcaster regularly showing music videos being Channel 6 or City Channel. However, for several years TV3 ran a late-night music programme, which quite often showed uncensored music videos containing large amounts of nudity.

References to records or songs being "banned" in Ireland refer to one or more radio stations refusing to play the songs rather than any legislative ban, although before 1989 it may have been a moot point given that the only legal broadcasting stations in Ireland were those operated by state broadcaster RTÉ. In the 1930s there was even a short-lived airplay ban on an entire genre of music known as the "ban on Jazz" (with an exceptionally wide definition of what constituted "jazz"). Such bans only served to further increase listenership to foreign radio stations (such as Radio Luxembourg and the BBC) in Ireland, and led to the growth of Irish pirate radio.

The ban by the Irish courts of the song "They never came home" by Christy Moore along with the original version of the album Ordinary Man on which it appeared has apparently never been overturned.

In late 2017 RTÉ's Irish language station Raidió na Gaeltachta removed the track "C.E.A.R.T.A" by west Belfast Irish language rap duo KNEECAP from an afternoon programme's playlist due to the song's "drug references and cursing".

Computer games

Unlike most other countries, the Film Censors Office have little involvement in video game censorship. This led to an unusual situation where in the 1990s the UK-owned GAME sold the sanitised versions of Carmageddon which was a victim of censorship in the UK, whilst Irish owned stores sold the uncut versions imported from the United States. Games may only be banned if the Film Censor judges that it is unfit for viewing, which has happened once to date, with the banning of Manhunt 2'' on 18 June 2007, over two weeks before its launch date of 6 July.

Ireland is a member of PEGI, but places no legal powers on its age recommendations. Retailers may attempt to enforce them at their discretion.

Irish statutes on censorship

The Censorship of Films Act 1923 was an act "to provide for the official censoring of cinematographic pictures and for other matters connected therewith".  It established the office of the Official Censor of Films and a Censorship of Films Appeal Board (and see William Magennis).  It was amended by the Censorship of Films (Amendment) Act 1925, in connection with advertisements for films. It was amended by the Censorship of Films (Amendment) Act 1930 to extend the legislation to "vocal or other sounds" accompanying pictures.
The Committee on Evil Literature was appointed in 1926 to report on the effectiveness of the censorship laws. It concluded that the then-current censorship laws were inadequate, and that the government had a duty to ban "morally corrupting" literature.
The Censorship of Publications Act 1929 was an act "to make provision for the prohibition of the sale and distribution of unwholesome literature and for that purpose to provide for the establishment of a censorship of books and periodical publications, and to restrict the publication of reports of certain classes of judicial proceedings and for other purposes incidental to the matters aforesaid". It established the Censorship of Publications Board. A book caught by the act was one that "in its general tendency indecent or obscene ... or ... advocates the unnatural prevention of conception or the procurement of abortion or miscarriage or the use of any method, treatment or appliance for the purpose of such prevention or such miscarriage".
The Emergency Powers Act 1939 dealt with the preservation of the State in time of war and contained provisions relating to the censorship of communications, including mail, newspapers and periodicals
The Censorship of Publications Act 1946 repealed a large part of the 1929 act and was "to make further and better provision for the censorship of books and periodical publications". Periodicals caught by the act included issues that "have devoted an unduly large proportion of space to the publication of matter relating to crime".
The Censorship of Publications Act 1967 provided for prohibition orders made on the grounds of indecency or obscenity to expire after a period of twelve years. A further prohibition order could then be made by the Censorship of Publications Board in respect of the same book.
The Health (Family Planning) Act 1979 deleted references to "the unnatural prevention of conception" in the Censorship of Publications Act 1929 and the Censorship of Publications Act 1946.
The Regulation of Information (Services Outside the State for Termination of Pregnancies) Act 1995 modified the effect of the Censorship of Publications Acts 1929 to 1967 in respect of certain information likely to be required by a woman to avail herself of "services provided outside the State for the termination of pregnancies". However, the information in question must not advocate or promote the termination of pregnancy.
The Defamation Act 2009 which defines such offences.
The Health (Regulation of Termination of Pregnancy) Act 2018 repealed
(a) sections 16 and 17 (1) of the Censorship of Publications Act 1929;
(b) sections 7 (b) and 9 (1)(b) of the Censorship of Publications Act 1946;
(c) section 10 of the Health (Family Planning) Act 1979;
(d) the Regulation of Information (Services outside the State for Termination of Pregnancies) Act 1995.
The Blasphemy (Abolition of Offences and Related Matters) Act 2019 which
(a) amended section 7 (2)(a)(ii) of the Censorship of Films Act 1923;
(b) amended section 3 (2) of the Censorship of Films (Amendment) Act 1925;
(c) repealed sections 36 and 37 of the Defamation Act 2009.

References

External links
 Irish Statute Book:
 Censorship of Publications Acts 1929, 1946, 1967
 Censorship of Films Acts 1923, amendments list
 What We Do > Other Regulatory Functions > Censorship/Classification — from Department of Justice website; links to most recent list of prohibited publications 
 Oireachtas Library Catalogue — lists digitised versions of annual reports via the following search queries:
 "censorship of publications board" (most years 1946–1981)
 "Film Censor" (1990–2008) and "Irish Film Classification Office" (since 2009)
Censorship in Ireland – from the International Freedom of Expression Exchange
Censorship of publications in Ireland — from the official Irish government information website
Tales out of school — Irish author John McGahern's experience with the Irish censorship system
Sunday Times article on Irish Censor's office
Survey on attitudes of Dublin Population to Section 31 of the Broadcasting Act, Niall Meehan, Jean Horgan, Dublin City University monograph, January 1987

 
Irish culture